Liston Nunatak is a large nunatak immediately northwest of Heintz Peak in the Welch Mountains of Palmer Land, Antarctica. It was mapped by the United States Geological Survey in 1974, and was named by the Advisory Committee on Antarctic Names for Commander John M. Liston of the U.S. Navy, who served during Operation Deep Freeze as Operations Officer for Antarctic Support Activities in 1969 and as Executive Officer in 1970.

References

Nunataks of Palmer Land